Aalavandhan is a 2001 Indian action thriller film directed by Suresh Krissna and produced by S. Thanu. An adaptation of the novel Dhayam that was written by Kamal Haasan in 1984, The film stars Haasan in dual roles, with Raveena Tandon, Manisha Koirala, Sarath Babu, Gollapudi Maruti Rao, Madurai G.S. Mani and Milind Gunaji in supporting roles. It has elements of magic realism.

The film was simultaneously filmed in Hindi with the title Abhay with three different actors. Although a commercial failure during its release, Aalavandhan and Abhay won the National Film Award for Best Special Effects.

Plot 

Major Vijay Kumar and his group of the Black Cats save a group of tourists held hostage by terrorists in a Kashmir valley. Meanwhile, at a military hospital, Vijay meets his girlfriend Tejaswini aka Teju, a news presenter who he is ready to marry. Teju reveals she is pregnant after she presents her HCG report to Vijay after one of their dates gone wrong. Vijay then reveals to Teju about  his plan to visit his twin brother, Nandhakumar "Nandhu", in a mental asylum who is incarcerated for murdering his stepmother.

Nandhu is a cleverly scheming and with good physical strength, yet paranoidal schizophrenic man who has spent most of his life in the asylum, often communicating using metaphors and poetic expressions. Vijay cares about Nandhu and looks forward to his release, but Nandhakumar's doctor tells him that Nandhu has developed into a psychopath. He is now a danger to society and should not be released.

Vijay and Teju visit Nandhu to share the news about their impending marriage, which turns disastrous as Nandhu begins to see Teju in the image of his stepmother. Seeking to save Vijay from Teju, Nandhu manages to escape custody after killing two other inmates Sulthan and Paasha, for a clean getaway, thus leaving no trail. He later meets his maternal uncle, who was responsible for incarcerating him. The man dies of choking upon seeing his nephew. Vijay and Teju get married. The next day Vijay and Teju are shocked to learn of Nandhu's escape. Vijay initially refuses to believe it was Nandhu who escaped. But, Nandhu's doctor believes it was Nandhu who escaped, because of the similarity that both Nandhu and his murdered buddy Sulthan are circumcised due to health reasons after the postmortem of Sulthan's beheaded corpse, thus proving Nandhu is circumcised. Later, Vijay is convinced that it was Nandhu.

Nandhu visits Vijay's home when he is not there and leaves a message about wanting to kill Teju. He keeps hallucinating his deceased mother in his imagination. While searching for Teju, Nandhu kills a drug peddler and falls in love with a socialite Sharmilee by looking at her promotional posters. By chance, he stumbles across Sharmilee at a hotel. Sharmilee ecstatically falls for Nandhu upon his antics, and both become close. Both being drugged, Sharmilee playfully whips Nandhu, which inadvertently causes him to visualise his stepmother's whippings and brutally murders her as a result. After returning to his senses, he regrets his actions and tearfully burns Sharmilee's corpse before exiting the room, but leaves behind evidence through which Vijay deduces him as the murderer.

Vijay and Teju leave for Vijay's ancestral home in Ooty to stay safe from Nandhu, but he secretly follows them. Vijay and Teju find Nandhu's old diary in the house through which they read his past: Vijay and Nandhu's mother committed suicide after realising that Santhosh, their father was having an affair with Jayanthi, who later became their stepmother. Both brothers hate her, especially Nandhu. The teacher complains about this, and Nandhu justifies that he is only reflecting the home environment. Enraged, Santhosh beats both his sons for disliking his new wife.

One day, Vijay learn that Jayanthi is having an affair with another man and Nandhu tries telling this to his father, who pays no heed, and instead beats him. Nandhu pleads to his maternal uncle to take him along with him. But as he is suffering from throat cancer, he refuses and suggests a boarding school. Eventually, Vijay leaves with his uncle to a boarding school while Nandhu remains home.

The situation gets worse at home with Nandhu and Jayanthi turning violent, and Santhosh gets a heart attack. Nandhu overhears a conversation between Jayanthi and a lawyer, and realises that she is only after his father's wealth. Seeing this, Santhosh dies due to another heart attack. Nandhu now starts to see both his deceased parents in his hallucinations, as a result of being turned into a psychopath due to his stepmother's cruel antics. His mother gives him the mission of killing Jayanthi, granting him a military knife. Nandhu stabs Jayanthi with the knife, but before dying, she vows that she will return. Nandhu stays with Jayanthi's corpse in the house before being incarcerated at the asylum.

In the present, Vijay learns from his old friend Tenoosh Kooth that Nandhu has reached Ooty. Vijay reaches on time to save Teju from Nandhu, who entered their hotel room and leaves with her. Nandhu, after getting a serpent styled tattoo all over his body which resembles the bond between the brothers by Tenoosh Kooth, decides to exact revenge on Teju. He chases the couple wreaking havoc across the road. After a while, they escape from the clutches of Nandhu, Vijay manages to push Nandhu's car into an abyss and assumes he is dead. However, Nandhu escapes and continues his trail. Vijay plans to leave the city and notices Nandhu coming to the hotel secretly.

Vijay and his commandos try to nab him, but he takes on everyone and kills many. Finally, the brothers have a fight where Nandhu overcomes Vijay. He corners Teju, who starts whacking him with a belt in self-defense, reminding Nandhu of Jayanthi's manner of punishing him. Vijay reaches by then, and there is another fight between the brothers. Nandhu visualises his mother asking him to join her as Jayanthi is torturing her up there. He realises his mistake and apologises to Vijay for chasing Teju. To kill his stepmother, he lights up some cylinders which explode and he dies.

Some months later, Teju is revealed to be pregnant with twins. She fears they will have the same traumatic childhood Vijay and Nandhu had, but Vijay comforts her by telling her that they shall provide good parental care and such thing will not happen.

Cast

Tamil version

 Kamal Haasan as Major Vijay Kumar (Vijay) and Nandha Kumar (Nandhu) 
 Raveena Tandon as Tejaswini 'Teju', News reporter for Star News channel; Vijay's wife.
 Manisha Koirala as Sharmilee, the socialite who was love interest of Nandhu and killed by Nandhu.
  Madhurai G.S.Mani  as the Psychiatrist doctor
 Milind Gunaji as Colonel Santhosh Kumar, Nandhu and Vijay's father; Priya's widower; Jayanthi's late husband. (voice dubbed by Nassar)
 Sarath Babu as Tejaswini's father
 Fathima Babu as Tejaswini's mother
 Anu Haasan as Priya Kumar, Nandhu and Vijay's late mother, Santosh's late wife (cameo appearance)
 Kitu Gidwani as Jayanthi Kumar, Nandhu and Vijay's cruel stepmother, Santhosh's second wife.
 Riyaz Khan as Sulthan
 Vikram Gokhale as Nandhu and Vijay's maternal uncle Ranganath
Poovilangu Mohan as Nandhu and Vijay's headmaster
 Yashpal Sharma as the Kashmiri militant
 Major Ravi as Menon, Vijay's buddy in Black cat
 Vikram Dharma as a Drug peddler
 Nissar Khan as Sonu, Vijay's buddy in Black cat
 Raji Iyer as Malathi, Teju's coworker in Star News channel
 Krishna Bhatt as Tenoosh Kooth, a mentally unstable Kota tribesman
 Mirchi Shiva in "Siri Siri" song (uncredited role)

Hindi version
All characters mentioned above in the Tamil version are the same in the Hindi version except Nandu's name, the doctor's character, and Tejaswini's parent's characters have been played by different actors.
 Kamal Haasan as Major Vijay Kumar 'Vijay' and Abhay Kumar 'Abhay'
 Naveen Nischol as Ravinder, Tejaswini's father
 Smita Jaykar as Geeta, Tejaswini's mother
 Vallabh Vyas as  Srinivasa Rao, Psychiatrist doctor

Production 

In the early 1980s, Kamal Haasan wrote a story titled Dhayam for the journal, "Idhayam Pesugiradhu". He had discussed making the story into a film with K. Balachander during the period, but felt that the story was ahead of its time. In 2000, he picked up the story again and agreed to make the film with director Suresh Krissna, a former assistant of Balachander, and producer S. Thanu. When Thanu had agreed to produce a film for Haasan, he had initially rejected the storylines of Pammal K. Sambandam and Nala Damayanthi. This prompted the pair to begin work on Dhayam instead, and the film was revealed to be called Aalavandhan in Tamil and Abhay in Hindi. Abhay was distributed by reputed Shringar Films. Mahesh Mahadevan was signed on to compose the background music, Tirru was selected to be the cinematographer and Sameer Chanda was picked to be the art director. Actor Jayam Ravi also worked on the film as an assistant director.

The film was first announced with Haasan and Simran  and Bollywood actress Rani Mukerji in a special appearance. Both actresses left the project for its delay in start, being replaced by Raveena Tandon and Manisha Koirala. Producer Dhanu had initially tried to cast Aishwarya Rai in the film, but the actress did not sign the project.

Composer Harris Jayaraj was first approached by the producer to do music for the movie, and he assured to introduce him as a music composer before Minnale. But Harris refused as he owed to do his first movie with Gautham Vasudev Menon. Later, music trio Shankar–Ehsaan–Loy was signed as music composers.

 The film featured Haasan in two distinct roles, for one of which he had his head shaved bald and gained ten kilograms. To play the other in the film, he went to the National Defence Academy for a crash course and also consulted his co-actor Major Ravi, who was a former officer in the Indian Army.  Stunt choreographer Grant Page, who had worked in the American film It's a Mad, Mad, Mad, Mad World, was assigned to compose stunt sequences in Kashmir. Another fight sequence was shot in Delhi for 15 days using 39 cars with 3 cameras with a machine called Airramp brought from abroad for jumping scenes.

Soundtrack 
The soundtrack of the movie was composed by the music trio Shankar–Ehsaan–Loy making their debut in Tamil, and the film score is composed by Mahesh Mahadevan. The film features six tracks in both Tamil and Hindi 
versions with lyrics written by Vairamuthu and Javed Akhtar respectively.

The album of the film's Tamil version was released on 24 September 2001, and it created a record by selling over 2,00,000 copies in less than eight hours of its release. However, according to Rediff, it "did not live up to expectations."

Release 
Started on a budget of 7 crore, the costs associated with Aalavandhan tripled by the time of release. The film was released on 16 November 2001, during Diwali. The Hindi version Abhay was bought over in Maharashtra by the reputed Shringar Films. The number of prints in Tamil Nadu had been increased by almost 5 times the average. Both Aalavandhan and Abhay got A (adults only) certificate from the CBFC. Later, both were re-examined upon request to get a UA certificate.

The film was the top opener of the Diwali weekend at the box office but was not successful. According to Bollywood Hungama, Abhay collected 2.02 crore at the box office.

Reception 

Initial reviews at the time of the film's release were mixed. Malathi Rangarajan of The Hindu said, "Too much publicity can sometimes affect a film adversely, because of the great expectations triggered. In the case of Aalavandhan, the hype and hoopla built up for months seems justified — to a certain extent". The film won the National Film Award for Best Special Effects at the 49th National Film Awards in 2002.

Reviewing the Hindi version Abhay, Taran Adarsh said, "On the whole, Abhay has nothing to offer to the masses or the classes. Poor". Rediff author R. Swaminathan said, "What happens when an exceptionally talented actor develops an inexplicable urge to delve into the dark side of the human psyche, and worse, decides to paint the town red about it? Well, for one, you get a film called Abhay."  Vijay Ramanan of Planet Bollywood rated the film 5.5 out of 10, saying, "The film falls flat on its face because of its failure in the two most important departments of filmmaking – scriptwriting, and direction [...] It almost seems as if Kamal Haasan and Suresh Krishna were high on drugs while making this film." Smriti Kashyap of fullhyd.com said "The movie is a huge letdown. It lacks the pop, snap and crackle to fill you with enough guts to potter down to the theater and watch it. Catch it on the CD, it's easier on the brains."

Although the film failed commercially, it was positively received over the next few years, subsequently becoming a cult classic, with some critics stating that the film was "way ahead of its time". The film was shown in the 2016 Fantastic Fest, where it was acclaimed by the American audiences. In 2013, Rediff included the film in its list, "The 10 Best Films of Kamal Haasan".

Awards 
National Film Awards
 Best Special Effects - N. Madhusudhanan

Tamil Nadu State Film Awards
 Best Editor - Kasi Viswanathan

Re-release 
Following the film's positive response at the 2016 Fantastic Fest, a digitally restored version was announced. On 25 January 2023, it was announced that the film would release in over 1000 screens, although no release date was provided.

Alternate cut 
In April 2021, Thanu announced that he would release a re-edited version of Aalavandhan.

Legacy 
The song "Kadavul Paathi Mirugam Paathi" inspired a 2015 film of same name directed by Raaj Menon.

References

Bibliography

External links 
 
 Abhay on rediff.com

2001 films
Films based on Indian novels
2001 action thriller films
Indian action thriller films
Films directed by Suresh Krissna
Twins in Indian films
Indian multilingual films
2001 psychological thriller films
Indian films with live action and animation
2000s Tamil-language films
2000s Hindi-language films
Films with screenplays by Kamal Haasan
Films scored by Shankar–Ehsaan–Loy
Tamil-language psychological thriller films
Indian Army in films
Magic realism films
Films that won the Best Special Effects National Film Award
2001 multilingual films
Hindi-language thriller films
Child abuse in fiction